The 1970 Norwegian Football Cup was the 65th edition of the Norwegian annual knockout football tournament. The Cup was won by Strømsgodset after beating Lyn in the cup final with the score 4–2. This was Strømsgodset's second Norwegian Cup title.

First round

|-
|colspan="3" style="background-color:#97DEFF"|Replay

|}

Second round

|-
|colspan="3" style="background-color:#97DEFF"|Replay

|}

Third round

|colspan="3" style="background-color:#97DEFF"|26 July 1970

|-
|colspan="3" style="background-color:#97DEFF"|28 July 1970

|-
|colspan="3" style="background-color:#97DEFF"|29 July 1970

|-
|colspan="3" style="background-color:#97DEFF"|Replay: 29 July 1970

|}

Fourth round

|colspan="3" style="background-color:#97DEFF"|9 August 1970

|-
|colspan="3" style="background-color:#97DEFF"|Replay: 20 August 1970

|-
|colspan="3" style="background-color:#97DEFF"|2nd replay: 27 August 1970

|}

Quarter-finals

|colspan="3" style="background-color:#97DEFF"|30 August 1970

|}

Semi-finals

|colspan="3" style="background-color:#97DEFF"|4 October 1970

|-
|colspan="3" style="background-color:#97DEFF"|Replay: 18 October 1970

|}

Final

Strømsgodset's winning squad: Inge Thun, Arild Mathisen, Jan Kristiansen, Tor Alsaker-Nøstdahl, Erik Eriksen, Odd Arild Amundsen, Egil Olsen, Bjørn Odmar Andersen, Steinar Pettersen, Thorodd Presberg, Ingar Pettersen; 
Ole Johnny Friise, Håvard Beckstrøm, Johnny Vidar Pedersen, Sverre Rørvik and Per Rune Wølner.

Lyn's team: Svein Bjørn Olsen, Jan Rodvang, Helge Østvold, Tore Børrehaug,
Knut Kolle, Arild Gulden, Andreas Morisbak, Ola Dybwad-Olsen, Sven Otto Birkeland, Trygve Christophersen and Jon Palmer Austnes.

References
http://www.rsssf.no

Norwegian Football Cup seasons
Norway
Football Cup